Land development is the alteration of landscape in any number of ways such as:
 Changing landforms from a natural or semi-natural state for a purpose such as agriculture or housing
 Subdividing real estate into lots, typically for the purpose of building homes
 Real estate development or changing its purpose, for example by converting an unused factory complex into a condominium.

Economic aspects
In an economic context, land development is also sometimes advertised as land improvement or land amelioration. It refers to investment  making land more usable by humans. For accounting purposes it refers to any variety of projects that increase the value of the process . Most are depreciable, but some land improvements are not able to be depreciated because a useful life cannot be determined. Home building and containment are two of the most common and the oldest types of development.

In an urban context, land development furthermore includes:
 Road construction
 Access roads, walkways, and parking lots 
 Bridges 
 Landscaping
 Clearing, terracing,  or land levelling 
Land preparation (development) for gardens
 Setup of fences and, to a lesser degree, hedges 
 Service connections to municipal services and public utilities
 Drainage, canal systems  
 External lighting (street lamps etc.)

A landowner or developer of a project of any size, will often want to maximise profits, minimise risk, and control cash flow. This "profitable  energy" means identifying and developing the best scheme for the local marketplace, whilst satisfying the local planning process.

Development analysis puts development prospects and the development process itself under the microscope, identifying where enhancements and improvements can be introduced. These improvements aim to align with best design practice, political sensitivities, and the inevitable social requirements of a project, with the overarching objective of increasing land values and profit margins on behalf of the landowner or developer.

Development analysis can add significantly to the value of land and development, and as such is a crucial tool for landowners and developers. It is an essential step in Kevin A. Lynch's 1960 book The Image of the City, and is considered to be essential to realizing the value potential of land. The landowner can share in additional planning gain (significant value uplift) via an awareness of the land's development potential. This is done via a residual development appraisal or residual valuation. The residual appraisal calculates the sale value of the end product (the gross development value or GDV) and hypothetically deducts costs, including planning and construction costs, finance costs and developer's profit. The "residue", or leftover proportion, represents the land value. Therefore, in maximising the GDV (that which one could build on the land), land value is concurrently enhanced.

Land value is highly sensitive to supply and demand (for the end product), build costs, planning and affordable housing contributions, and so on. Understanding the intricacies of the development system and the effect of "value drivers" can result in massive differences in the landowner's sale value.

Conversion of landforms
Land development puts more emphasis on the expected economic development as a result of the process; "land conversion" tries to focus on the general physical and biological aspects of the land use change. "Land improvement" in the economic sense can often lead to land degradation from the ecological perspective. Land development and the change in land value does not usually take into account changes in the ecology of the developed area. While conversion of (rural) land with a vegetation carpet to building land may result in a rise in economic growth and rising land prices, the irreversibility of lost flora and fauna because of habitat destruction, the loss of ecosystem services and resulting decline in environmental value is only considered a priori in environmental full-cost accounting.

Conversion to building land

Conversion to building land is as a rule associated with road building, which in itself already brings topsoil abrasion, soil compaction and modification of the soil's chemical composition through soil stabilization, creation of impervious surfaces and, subsequently, (polluted) surface runoff water.

Construction activity often effectively seals off a larger part of the soil from rainfall and the nutrient cycle, so that the soil below buildings and roads is effectively "consumed" and made infertile.

With the notable exception of attempts at rooftop gardening and hanging gardens in green buildings (possibly as constituents of green urbanism), vegetative cover of higher plants is lost to concrete and asphalt surfaces, complementary interspersed garden and park areas notwithstanding.

Conversion to farmland

New creation of farmland (or 'agricultural land conversion') will rely on the conversion and development of previous forests, savannas or grassland. Recreation of farmland from wasteland, deserts or previous impervious surfaces is considerably less frequent because of the degraded or missing fertile soil in the latter. Starting from forests, land is made arable by assarting or slash-and-burn. 
Agricultural development furthermore includes: 
 Hydrological measures (land levelling, drainage, irrigation, sometimes landslide and flood control)
 Soil improvement (fertilization, establishment of a productive chemical balance).
 Road construction

Because the newly created farmland is more prone to erosion than soil stabilized by tree roots, such a conversion may mean irreversible crossing of an ecological threshold.

The resulting deforestation is also not easily compensated for by reforestation or afforestation. This is because plantations of other trees as a means for water conservation and protection against wind erosion (shelterbelts), as a rule, lack the biodiversity of the lost forest, especially when realized as monocultures.  These deforestation consequences may have lasting effects on the environment including soil stabilization and erosion control measures that may not be as effective in preserving topsoil as the previous intact vegetation.

Restoration
Massive land conversion without proper consideration of ecological and geological consequences may lead to disastrous results, such as: 
 General soil degradation
 Catastrophic soil salination and solonchak formation, e.g., in Central Asia, as a consequence of irrigation by saline groundwater
 Desertification, soil erosion and ecological shifts due to drainage
 Leaching of saline soils
 Habitat loss for the wildlife.

While deleterious effects can be particularly visible when land is developed for industrial or mining usage, agro-industrial and settlement use can also have a massive and sometimes irreversible impact on the affected ecosystem.

Examples of land restoration/land rehabilitation counted as land development in the strict sense are still rare. However, renaturation, reforestation, stream restoration may all contribute to a healthier environment and quality of life, especially in densely populated regions. The same is true for planned vegetation like parks and gardens, but restoration plays a particular role, because it reverses previous conversions to built and agricultural areas.

Environmental issues
The environmental impact of land use and development is a substantial consideration for land development projects. On the local level an environmental impact report (EIR) may be necessary. In the United States, federally funded projects typically require preparation of an environmental impact statement (EIS). The concerns of private citizens or political action committees (PACs) can influence the scope, or even cancel, a project based on concerns like the loss of an endangered species’ habitat.

In most cases, the land development project will be allowed to proceed if mitigation requirements are met. Mitigation banking is the most prevalent example, and necessitates that the habitat will have to be replaced at a greater rate than it is removed.  This increase in total area helps to establish the new ecosystem, though it will require time to reach maturity.

Biodiversity impacts
The extent, and type of land use directly affects wildlife habitat and thereby impacts local and global biodiversity. Human alteration of landscapes from natural vegetation (e.g. wilderness) to any other use can result in habitat loss, degradation, and fragmentation, all of which can have devastating effects on biodiversity. Land conversion is the single greatest cause of extinction of terrestrial species. An example of land conversion being a chief cause of the critically endangered status of a carnivore is the reduction in habitat for the African wild dog, Lycaon pictus.

Deforestation is also the reason for loss of a natural habitat, with large numbers of trees being cut down for residential and commercial use. Urban growth has become a problem for forests and agriculture, the expansion of structures prevents natural resources from producing in their environment.  In order to prevent the loss of wildlife the forests must maintain a stable climate and the land must remain unaffected by development.   Furthermore, forests can be sustained by different forest management techniques such as reforestation and preservation. Reforestation is a reactive approach designed to replant trees that were previously logged within the forest boundary in attempts to re-stabilize this ecosystem. Preservation on the other hand is a proactive idea that promotes the concept of leaving the forest as is, without using this area for its ecosystem goods and services. Both of these methods to mitigate deforestation are being used throughout the world.

The U.S. Forest service predicts that urban and developing terrain in the U.S. will expand by 41 percent in the year 2060. These conditions cause displacement for the wildlife and limited resources for the environment to maintain a sustainable balance.

See also 

Agricultural expansion
Built-up area
Colonization
Manifest destiny
Developed environments
Developmentalism
Environmental impact statement
Illegal construction
Infrastructure
Land consumption
Land development bank
Land grabbing
Land management
Land reclamation
Land recycling
Landscape ecology
Land-use conflict
Leopold matrix
Mitigation banking
Ocean development
Political action committee
Real estate development
Subdivision (land)
Subsurface drainage
Sustainable agriculture
Urban planning
Urban renewal
Watertable control

References

 R.J. Oosterbaan, International Institute for Land Reclamation and Improvement, Wageningen, The Netherlands. "Improvement of waterlogged and saline soils." Free downloads of software and articles on land drainage.
 
 
 

Construction
Urban planning
Earthworks (engineering)
Land management
Real estate